The Ivory Coast national rugby union team, nicknamed Les Éléphants, participates in the annual Africa Cup and are considered a third tier rugby team.

Formed in 1990, the team's most significant achievement to date was their success in qualifying for the Rugby World Cup for their first and so far only time in 1995. They have not qualified since, though they did reach the semi-finals of the African qualifying competition for the 2011 Rugby World Cup, achieving a home draw against eventual qualifiers Namibia before being defeated in their away match.

Rugby union in Côte d'Ivoire is popular among school children, but the rugby union playing population in Côte d'Ivoire is still relatively small with only 14 clubs and 470 registered senior players.

The national side is ranked 43rd in the world (as of 29 July 2019).

History
The Fédération Ivoirienne de Rugby, the national rugby union federation, was formed in March 1990, the same month that it joined the International Rugby Board. They qualified for the World Cup the first time in 1995 and suffered defeats by Scotland, France and Tonga.

With a small player base, and starved of strong competition, the team has deteriorated in recent years. Recent defeats to Morocco mean they are ranked below the North African side. Their record in the World Cup has been poor, and they haven't managed a win. Their record defeat, 89–0 against Scotland in the 1995 tournament, led to some questioning the presence of the minor teams at the tournament. Ivory Coast, however, played much better in the following match, losing to France by 54–18, with 2 tries scored. The final match with Tonga, lost by 29–11, in the 1995 World Cup saw a major tragedy, as Max Brito suffered a cervical spine injury that left him a quadriplegic.

After the 1995 Rugby World Cup, Ivory Coast took a three years break from international competition, only returning for the 1999 Rugby World Cup qualifyings, in September 1998. Ivory Coast was very unfortunate, losing all the three matches, to Namibia (10–22), Zimbabwe (0–32), and Morocco (3–6), in a tournament held in Casablanca, Morocco.

After another hiatus of two years and a half, the Elephants returned for the Africa Championship, in 2001, losing both matches with Morocco, 11–18 at home and 18–20 away, and achieving an 11–11 draw with Tunisia, abroad, and a 46–0 win at home.

Ivory Coast missed the 2003 Rugby World Cup qualification, after losses to Tunisia (8–13) and Morocco (21–23). In the 2007 Rugby World Cup qualifyings, they started promisingly with two wins with Senegal (20–6) and Zimbabwe (33–3), but had mixed results with Morocco, a 9–9 draw at home and a 7–23 loss abroad, and Uganda, with a 7–32 loss abroad and an 18–9 win at home, and were subsequently eliminated.

The Ivorians advanced of the semi final stage of the 2011 Rugby World Cup qualifiers, after a 21–9 win over Morocco, in Casablanca. They faced Namibia afterwards, reaching a 13–13 draw at Abidjan, but losing by 14–54 in Windhoek, being unable to qualify once again.

In the 2015 World Cup qualifying campaign the Ivory Coast were eliminated at the group stage after coming second in a five team group. Each team only played two matches so despite winning both their matches they finished behind Botswana who also won both their matches.

Results summary

As of 12 July 2021 their record against all nations is as follows:

World Cup record

Current squad
Squad for the 2011 World Cup qualifiers against Namibia. Ivory Coast squad for the Africa Cup match Morocco (3-60) is available here.

See also
 Fédération Ivoirienne de Rugby
 Rugby union in Ivory Coast
 Ivory Coast at the Rugby World Cup

References

External links
 Ivory Coast on IRB.com
 Ivory Coast on rugbydata.com 

African national rugby union teams
Rugby union in Ivory Coast
National sports teams of Ivory Coast
1990 establishments in Ivory Coast
Rugby clubs established in 1990